Rolling Meadows is a city in Cook County, Illinois, United States. Per the 2020 census, the population was 24,200.

History

Other farm families followed, many traveling from Vermont. By the early 1840s, settlers had built a dam across Salt Creek and had laid claim to the entire Plum Grove area.

The community became part of the newly formed Palatine Township in 1850 as German immigrants arrived. In 1862, the Salem Evangelical Church was built, and the church's  cemetery still exists at the corner of Kirchoff and Plum Grove roads.

In 1927, H.D. "Curly" Brown bought  of land in the area with the intention of building a golf course, along with land adjacent to it for a racetrack. In the early 1950s, Kimball Hill purchased the land intended for the golf course, and began home sales by advertising a floor plan of his basic house in the Chicago Tribune. Although the response was positive, officials in neighboring Arlington Heights protested, hoping to buy the land themselves for estate homes. However, prospective buyers of the Kimball Hill homes persuaded the Cook County Board for zoning changes to allow Hill to proceed.

In 1953, the first families moved into the development, which Hill named Rolling Meadows, and 700 houses were sold by 1955, mostly to blue-collar workers. Hill donated $200 per home for a school system, and then built and equipped the first elementary school. He also founded the Rolling Meadows Homeowners' Association and donated land for parks, as well as funded the Clearbrook Center, which is a home for individuals with cognitive disabilities that opened in 1955.

Rolling Meadows incorporated as a city in 1955 and soon began annexing land for future development. The town boomed during the 1950s and 1960s as businesses moved into the area. Crawford's department store opened in 1957 and was the largest in the northwest suburbs, although it closed in 1994. An industrial park opened on North Hicks Road in 1958, and Western Electric opened a facility in the 1960s, employing 1,500 workers. Developers saturated the area with apartment buildings, and by 1970, multifamily dwellings made up 35 percent of the total structures in Rolling Meadows. Rolling Meadows complexes, however, suffered from a series of fires in the decade, prompting the city to become more stringent in their building codes, which had allowed for frame multifamily structures.

By 2000, the city had begun revamping commercial areas along Kirchoff Road. In the south end of the city on Golf Road, corporations such as 3Com, Helene Curtis, and Charles Industries established bases in what has become known as the Golden Corridor.

Geography

Demographics
As of the 2020 census there were 24,200 people, 8,491 households, and 6,013 families residing in the city. The racial makeup of the city was 59.48% White, 2.80% African American, 1.28% Native American, 13.07% Asian, 0.07% Pacific Islander, 12.69% from other races, and 10.61% from two or more races. Hispanic or Latino of any race were 25.26% of the population.

There were 8,491 households, out of which 53.52% had children under the age of 18 living with them, 54.48% were married couples living together, 9.70% had a female householder with no husband present, and 29.18% were non-families. 23.18% of all households were made up of individuals, and 12.17% had someone living alone who was 65 years of age or older. The average household size was 3.21 and the average family size was 2.69.

The city's age distribution consisted of 22.7% under the age of 18, 7.0% from 18 to 24, 29.6% from 25 to 44, 25.5% from 45 to 64, and 15.3% who were 65 years of age or older. The median age was 38.0 years. For every 100 females, there were 106.1 males. For every 100 females age 18 and over, there were 101.3 males.

The median income for a household in the city was $78,609, and the median income for a family was $91,197. Males had a median income of $47,151 versus $40,566 for females. The per capita income for the city was $37,478. About 3.6% of families and 5.6% of the population were below the poverty line, including 5.4% of those under age 18 and 5.4% of those age 65 or over.

Note: the US Census treats Hispanic/Latino as an ethnic category. This table excludes Latinos from the racial categories and assigns them to a separate category. Hispanics/Latinos can be of any race.

Economy

The Chicago-area office of Huawei is located at 3601 Algonquin Road. The Chicago-area sales office of Asiana Airlines is located at Suite 1010 of Continental Towers # 3.

According to the city's 2018 Comprehensive Annual Financial Report, the top employers in the city are:

Parks and recreation

The Rolling Meadows Park District was formed in 1958, and has been a finalist for the National Gold Medal award for excellence in parks and recreation management four times.

The Salt Creek Rural Park District was formed in 1956, and provides recreation and leisure services to the residents that live within the corporate boundaries of the district, which include parts of the village of Arlington Heights, Palatine, and the city of Rolling Meadows.  The district also provides recreation and leisure services to non-residents of the area on a fee basis.

Education

Primary and secondary schools

Almost all of Rolling Meadows is served by Palatine Community Consolidated School District 15. District 15 schools in Rolling Meadows include Central Road (K-6), Kimball Hill (K-6), Willow Bend (K-6), John G. Conyers Learning Academy (early childhood and multiple needs), Carl Sandburg Jr. High (7-8) which takes students from Thomas Jefferson (K-6) in North Hoffman Estates, Central Road, Kimball Hill and Willow Bend. Plum Grove Jr. High (7-8) takes students from Stuart R. Paddock (K-6), Pleasant Hill (K-6), Hunting Ridge (K-6) all located in Palatine, Frank C. Whiteley (K-6) in Hoffman Estates, Central Road and Willow Bend.

A very small portion is served by Arlington Heights School District 25, which includes Westgate Elementary School and South Middle School, where students then attend RMHS. Another smaller portion is served by Schaumburg Consolidated School District 54 and Adlai Stevenson Elementary School in Elk Grove Village, Margaret Mead Junior High School and WFHS, and a small portion extends into Community Consolidated School District 59; that portion has no residents.

About half of Rolling Meadows is served by Township High School District 214's Rolling Meadows High School. The other half is served by Township High School District 211 by William Fremd High School in Palatine.

The Roman Catholic Archdiocese of Chicago operates Catholic schools. St. Colette School is a preK-8 Catholic school serving all of Rolling Meadows. St. Colette School was awarded as a 2007 Blue Ribbon School from the U.S. Department of Education. The student population from circa 2017 to 2020 declined by 97. In 2020 its budget deficit was $500,000. Therefore the archdiocese decided to close the school after Spring 2020.

Notable people

 Bryan Anderson, Iraqi War veteran and author 
 Jay Bennett, guitarist with band Wilco
 Gary Cole, film and television actor
 Carol Marin, television and print journalist
 Tim McIlrath, lead singer to punk-rock band Rise Against; lived in Arlington Heights
 Scott Tolzien, NFL quarterback with Indianapolis Colts, Green Bay Packers
 Jimmy Garoppolo, NFL quarterback with New England Patriots, San Francisco 49ers

References

External links
City of Rolling Meadows official website

Cities in Illinois
Chicago metropolitan area
Cities in Cook County, Illinois
Populated places established in 1953
1955 establishments in Illinois